Ogbe is a village in Nigeria. Ogbe may also refer to:

Ogbe ijaw, a town in Nigeria
Ogbe tribe of the Ijaw people in Nigeria
Utagba-Ogbe (Kwale), former settlement in Nigeria
Ogbe (name)